The jack of diamonds (also called the "knave of diamonds") is a playing card in the standard 52-card deck. 

Jack of Diamonds may also refer to:
 Jack of Diamonds (artists), Russian school
 The Jack of Diamonds, a 1949 film directed by Vernon Sewell
 Jack of Diamonds (1967 film), a film directed by Don Taylor
 "Jack of Diamonds" (song), a traditional folk song
 Jack of Diamonds (novel), a 2012 novel by Bryce Courtenay

See also

 or 

 Jack of Clubs (disambiguation)
 Jack of Hearts (disambiguation)
 Jack of Spades (disambiguation)
 Queen of Diamonds (disambiguation)
 King of Diamonds (disambiguation)
 Ace of Diamonds (disambiguation)
 Knave (disambiguation)
 Diamond Jack (disambiguation)
 Jack Diamond (disambiguation)